Attention, Love! was a 2017 Taiwanese television show  produced by Eastern Television. The show starred Joanne Tseng, Prince Chiu, Kuo Shu-yao and Riley Wang. Filming of the show began on October 12, 2016, and concluded on April 4, 2017. It aired on CTV every Sunday at 10:00 pm, starting on July 30, 2017.

Synopsis
A boy and a girl were destined to be together since birth. The two are the children of long-time best friends. One named their son Li Zheng, which means "attention", and the other named their daughter Shao Xi, which means "at ease". The two kids grew up to embody their names, with Li Zheng being diligent and paying extra attention to everything he wants to achieve in life and Shao Xi being more laid back and lazy in her approach to life and school. When Li Zheng returns to Taiwan after growing up in Japan, he meets Shao Xi for the first time since they were babies. Despite their polar opposite personalities, their fates bring them together.

Cast

Main cast
Joanne Tseng as Zhong Shao Xi 
Liao Pei Yu as child Shao Xi
Prince Chiu as Yan Li Zheng 
Lin You Quan as child Li Zheng
Riley Wang as Wang Jin Li 
Hou Pin Chen as child Jin Li
Kuo Shu-yao as An Xiao Qiao

Supporting cast

Carolyn Chen as Zhou Chu Hong 
Bokeh Kosang as Zhong Run Fa 
Huang Xin Di as Li Ru Ping 
Greg Hsu as Jin Yu Bin (Xiao Yu) 
Dewi Chien as Bai Ruo Lin (Bai Bai) 
Zhang Guang Chen as Da Mao 
Barry Q as Ah Ke 
Scott Yang as Xiao Jian 
Wu Yun Ting as Wu Yi Lin (Yi Yi) 
Hana Lin as Lin Xiao Er (Xiao Er) 
Elaine Ho as He Shan (Shan Shan)
Bye Bye Chu Chu as Nan Si

Cameo appearances

Cheng-Peng Kao as great-grandfather
Zhou Ming Fu as Yan Kuan Xiang 
Liao Yi Xuan as Lin Mei Yue 
Pai Ching-i as Hai Mei 
Ellen Wu as Kiki
Berry Wen-i Kuo as Nan Si's girlfriend
Lin Jia Feng as female class leader
Lin Xiao Long as Xiao Ha 
Fan Jin Qi as Heng Heng 
Ye Hui Zhi  as Zheng Jia Fen 
Lu Yan Ze as Ah Zhi 
Huang Hung Xuan as Teddy
Jian Jie as Kai Di
Ge Zi Xiang as principal of Lunghwa University

Special guests

Bo Zi as bad oppa
Lang Tsu-yun as Fu Ren Liang 
Hsieh Kun Da as Lin Zi Xiang 
Jeremiah Liu as Teacher Little Finger
Ke Shu-qin as Teacher Yue E 
Pauline Lan as Lu Mei Hua 
Ko Chia-yen as Han Rong 
Darren Chiu as Wang Jin Wen 
Shen Chang Hung as child Jin Wen
Wang Dao-Nan as Wang Bo Hai 
Tseng Yu-Jia as geek senior

Soundtrack

Attention, Love! Original TV Soundtrack (OST) (稍息立正我愛你 電視原聲帶) was released on August 18, 2017 by various artists under HIM International Music Inc. It contains a total of 11 tracks. The opening theme is the first track of the album, "Love is Happening", by Prince Chiu, while the closing theme is the second track, "Guess", by Joanne Tseng.

Track listing

Broadcast

Episode ratings

Awards and nominations

References

External links
Attention, Love! CTV Website  
 
 

2017 Taiwanese television series debuts
2017 Taiwanese television series endings
China Television original programming
Eastern Television original programming
Taiwanese romance television series
Taiwanese romantic comedy television series